Elyse is a 2020 American drama film written and directed by Stella Hopkins and starring Anthony Hopkins and Lisa Pepper.  It is Stella Hopkins' directorial debut.

Cast
Anthony Hopkins as Dr. Lewis
Lisa Pepper as Elyse
Aaron Tucker
Tara Arroyave
Fran Tucker
Anthony Apel
Julieta Oritiz
Danny Jacobs

Release
Gravitas Ventures acquired North American distribution rights to the film in October 2020.  The film was released in theaters and on VOD on December 4, 2020.

Reception
The film has  rating on Rotten Tomatoes.

Richard Roeper of the Chicago Sun-Times awarded the film one and a half stars out of four.

References

External links
 
Elyse on Rotten Tomatoes

American drama films
2020 drama films
2020 directorial debut films
2020 films
2020s English-language films
2020s American films